Oharaeibacter is a genus of bacteria from the family of Methylocystaceae with one known species (Oharaeibacter diazotrophicus).

References

Hyphomicrobiales
Bacteria genera
Monotypic bacteria genera